May Shin (10 March 1917 – 3 September 2008) was a Burmese actress and singer, who was popular from the 1930s to the 1950s.

Biography
May Shin was born Than Shin in 1917 to businessman Khin Lay and his wife Pwa Yon. in Mandalay in British Burma. She was the youngest of five siblings. She passed seventh grade from Wesleyan School. At 18, May Shin joined A1 Film Company as an aspiring actress. She was soon highly acclaimed for her soft gentle singing voice.

Her first film was Hpuza Shin, starring opposite actor Yegaung Chit Swe but she became known in the first Burmese sound film Hmya Nat Maung.

As a radio presenter at the Burma Broadcasting Service in the 1950s, she actively supported U Nu’s government against the left-wing campaign by appealing to armed insurgents to surrender. In 1958, she was awarded the title Wunnakyawhtin, the highest honor given to an artist by the Burmese government in that time. In 1962, at the age of 45, May Shin gave up acting and singing and withdrew from public life. She became devoutly Buddhist and practiced dharma until the day she died.

In 2004, purged Prime Minister Gen Khin Nyunt visited her in Mandalay shortly before he was arrested.

In her old age, the venerated actress and singer spent most of her time in Buddhist contemplation at her residence in Mandalay. Win Win Myint (aka Nandaw Shay), author of May Shin's biography, Pan Pwint Ye Yin Khon Than ("The Heartbeat of a Flower"), said that she never married and that she loved to uphold Burmese traditional culture and religion.

May Shin died of pulmonary edema at her residence in Aung Daw Mu Ward, Mandalay. She was 91.

Filmography
May Shin made 14 films in total.
Hpuza Shin
Mhya Nat Maung
Chit Tha Mhya
Chit Yay Sin
Saung Taw Shin
Chain Tan Pyi
May Thawda

Discography
She released over 40 records with A1 Records. The following is a list of her successful records.
Chit Yay Sin
Shwe Pyaung Pyaung
Aunggyin Shitpa
Pyo Mha Dan
Myat Lay Ngoun
Thawda Ngwe Min
Kyay Say Taman
Chit Khet Thetlya
Mya Kay Khine
Phoo Sar Paing
Shwe Moe Nyo
Lei Lei Win
Ko Pine Myittar
Kyaung Pate Yet
Mae Darli
Chit thal swal
Paramidaw
Shwe Wah Phoo
Shae Bayin
Chit Pann Hlwar
Mal Khu Hmyaw
Chit Pan Hlwar
Mane Yar thi
Khit Pyaung Chein
Mya Kay Khine
Thet Wai (With Pyi Hla Pe)
Shae Ku Tho (With Pyi Hla Pe)
Shae Yae Set (with Pyi Hla Pe)
Chit Mar Larr (With Pyi Hla Pe)

References

External links

1917 births
2008 deaths
Burmese film actresses
20th-century Burmese women singers
Deaths from pulmonary edema
20th-century Burmese actresses
Recipients of the Wunna Kyawhtin